The 1989 Sudanese coup d'état was a military coup that occurred in Sudan on 30 June 1989 against the democratically elected government of Prime Minister Sadiq al-Mahdi and President Ahmed al-Mirghani. The coup was led by military officer Omar al-Bashir who took power in its aftermath and would go on to rule the country for the next 30 years until he was overthrown in 2019.

History

Background

In 1983, a civil war broke out between Sudan's central government and the Sudan People's Liberation Army, and it was fought at great cost to the country's civilian population. In 1989 the number of civilian casualties that resulted from famine alone was estimated to be as high as 250,000. By February 1989, a group of Sudanese Army officers presented an ultimatum to the incumbent Prime Minister, Sadiq al-Mahdi, in which they asked him to either end the war or give the military the means to end it, with Mahdi choosing the former.

Mahdi's inability to put an end to the conflict in the months that followed, along with a crippled Sudanese economy, led to growing tension between him and the army officials. His decision on 18 June to arrest a group of 14 military officials and 50 civilians, all of whom were accused of being engaged in a plan to overthrow the government and restore former President Gaafar Nimeiry to power, may have further motivated the coup, though Nimeiry himself denied having any involvement in the plot.

Coup
On 30 June 1989, military officers under the command of then Brigadier Omar Hassan al-Bashir, with instigation and support from the National Islamic Front (NIF)
, replaced the Sadiq al-Mahdi government with the Revolutionary Command Council for National Salvation (RCC), claiming to be saving the country from the "rotten political parties." That same day, Al-Bashir was declared head of state, Prime Minister, Defense Minister and Commander in Chief of the armed forces. The new military junta would consist of 15 military officers (reduced to 12 in 1991) and it was assisted by a civilian cabinet.

Aftermath 
The coup put an end to the newly facilitated democratic system of government in Sudan, which was established in 1985, and replaced it with a totalitarian regime led by Omar al-Bashir, which was responsible for a series of war crimes and human rights violations. The support which the new Sudanese government received from the NIF, which would eventually lead it to receive support from Iran, enabled it to make large-scale arms purchases from China and the former Soviet republics, which it used to step up the still on-going civil war in the south in an effort to end it with a military victory. Under the heavy influence of the NIF, the government also banned political parties, trade unions, and other "nonreligious institutions", imposed tight controls on the press as well as strict dress and behavior codes on women. More than 78,000 people were purged from the army, police and civil administration, resulting in a thorough reshaping of the state apparatus.

Al-Bashir has been held responsible for the Darfur Genocide by the International Criminal Court, which has sought his extradition since 2008 on charges of genocide, war crimes, and crimes against humanity.
 
Al-Bashir's regime was removed from power in another military coup on 11 April 2019.

See also 

Revolutionary Command Council for National Salvation
National Islamic Front

References

Military coups in Sudan
Coup d'etat
Sudanese coup d'etat
1980s coups d'état and coup attempts
June 1989 events in Africa